Kill Me Kiss Me is the debut mini-album released by the group Hangry & Angry. It was released on November 19, 2008. There was no limited edition of the CD released, but 10,000 of the first available CDs in Japan featured a limited edition steel box case.

Track listing 
 Kill Me Kiss Me
 Angelia
 GIZA GIZA
 
 WALL FLOWER

2008 albums
Hangry & Angry albums
Zetima albums